The 2022 Grand Prix du Morbihan was the 45th edition of the Grand Prix du Morbihan, a one-day road cycling race held on 14 May 2022 in and around Grand-Champ, Morbihan, in the Brittany region of northwestern France.

Teams 
Six of the eighteen UCI WorldTeams, nine UCI ProTeams, and six UCI Continental teams made up the 21 teams that participated in the race.

UCI WorldTeams

 
 
 
 
 
 

UCI ProTeams

 
 
 
 
 
 
 
 
 

UCI Continental Teams

Result

References

External links 
  

Grand Prix du Morbihan
Grand Prix du Morbihan
Grand Prix du Morbihan
Grand Prix du Morbihan